Scotford Cogeneration Plant is a natural gas power station owned by Heartland Generation. The plant is located in Strathcona County, just northeast of Fort Saskatchewan, Alberta, Canada at the Scotford Upgrader site. The plant is primarily used to supply steam and electricity to the Athabasca Oilsands Upgrader (a joint venture between Shell Canada, Chevron Canada Resources Limited and Western Oilsands LP). The Upgrader utilizes two-thirds of the electricity generated with the balance being sold to the Alberta Interconnected Grid.

Description
The plant consists of:
 One GE 75A gas fired turbine 
 One heat recovery steam generator 
 One Alstom steam turbine

References

Natural gas-fired power stations in Alberta
Fort Saskatchewan
Strathcona County